is a village located in Nagano Prefecture, Japan. , the village had an estimated population of 7,101 in 2466 households, and a population density of 72 persons per km². Takayama is listed as one of The Most Beautiful Villages in Japan.

Geography
Takayama is located in northeastern Nagano Prefecture, bordered by Gunma Prefecture to the east. The village is located in a mountainous area, and includes Mount Kitahotaka partly within its borders.

Surrounding municipalities
Nagano Prefecture
 Nagano
 Suzaka
 Obuse
 Yamanouchi
Gunma Prefecture
Kusatsu
Tsumagoi
Nakanojō

Climate
The village has a Humid continental climate characterized by warm and humid summers, and cold with heavy snowfall winters (Köppen climate classification Dfb).  The average annual temperature in Takayama is 6.7 °C. The average annual rainfall is 1549 mm with September as the wettest month. The temperatures are highest on average in August, at around 24.9 °C, and lowest in January, at around -1.5 °C.

Demographics 
Per Japanese census data, the population of Takayama has remained fairly stable for much of the past century.

History
The area of present-day Takayama was part of ancient Shinano Province. Numerous ruins from the Jōmon period, Kofun period and Nara and Heian periods have been found, indicating continuous settlement for thousands of years. During the Edo period, much of the area was an exclave of Hamada Domain from Iwami Province or tenryō territory under the direct control of the Tokugawa shogunate. The villages of Takai and Yamada were established on April 1, 1889 by the establishment of the modern municipalities system. The two villages merged on September 30, 1956 to form the village of Takayama.

Economy
The economy of Takayama is based on agriculture, forestry, and seasonal tourism.

Education
Takayama has one public elementary school and one public middle school operated by the village government. The village does not have a high school.

Transportation

Railway
The village has no passenger railway service.

Highway
 The village is not located on any national highway.

References

External links

Official Website 

 
Villages in Nagano Prefecture